The 1880 New South Wales colonial election was held between 17 November and 2 December 1880. This election was for all of the 108 seats in the New South Wales Legislative Assembly and it was conducted in 43 single-member constituencies, 25 2-member constituencies, one 3-member constituency and three 4-member constituencies, all with a first past the post system. Suffrage was limited to adult white males. The previous parliament of New South Wales was dissolved on 9 November 1880 by the Governor, Lord Augustus Loftus, on the advice of the Premier, Sir Henry Parkes.

There was no recognisable party structure at this election; instead the government was determined by a loose, shifting factional system.

Key dates

Results
{{Australian elections/Title row
| table style = float:right;clear:right;margin-left:1em;
| title        = New South Wales colonial election, 17 November – 2 December 1880
| house        = Legislative Assembly
| series       = New South Wales colonial election
| back         = 1877
| forward      = 1882
| enrolled     = 
| total_votes  = 178,807
| turnout %    = 61.94
| turnout chg  = +13.63
| informal     = 2,001
| informal %   = 1.96
| informal chg = +0.95
}}

|}

References

See also
 Members of the New South Wales Legislative Assembly, 1880–1882
 Candidates of the 1880 New South Wales colonial election

1880
1880 elections in Australia
1880s in New South Wales
November 1880 events
December 1880 events